Eric Arthur Arnold (13 September 1922 – April 2002) was a footballer who played professionally for Norwich City from 1947 to 1952, making 13 appearances. He was a left back.

Sources
Canary Citizens by Mike Davage, John Eastwood, Kevin Platt, published by Jarrold Publishing, (2001),

References

1922 births
English footballers
Norwich City F.C. players
2002 deaths
English Football League players
Association football defenders
Place of death missing